Zita Szeleczky (born Zita Klára Terézia Szeleczky 20 April 1915 – 12 July 1999) was a Hungarian stage and film actress. She was discovered by the film studios in 1938 and soon became one of the most popular screen stars, performing in about 30 films between 1938-1944, mostly musical comedies. She was active in war effort and gave many patriotic recitals during the last days of the WW II, when the Soviet troops were already capturing Budapest. As Hungary was taken, she had to fake her own suicide and flee the country, where she in fact was sentenced to prison in absentia by the pro-soviet authorities. She spent years in Italy (where she had also starred in a film), Argentina and USA, but her film career was sadly never revived, even though she remained popular on concert stage. As the political climate changed, she returned to Hungary in 1988. In 1993 the Superior Court of Hungary exonerated Ms. Szeleczky, stating that the 1947 conviction was based on fabricated charges. She was awarded the Cross of the Hungarian Republic. Miss Szeleczky died in 1999. The Hungarian Postal Service issued a stamp commemorating the 100th anniversary of this beautiful actress and singer in 2015.

An article, written by a Hungarian emigree György Lázár in the USA, held the Hungarian Postal Service accountable for issuing a stamp with 'a fascist'. The article blames the actress for her involvement in the Hungarista movement and overlooks her status as a screen legend.  Miss Szeleczky never agreed to those accusations, seeing herself as an entertainer who strove to boost the morale of the troops, performing at the front and in hospitals for the wounded soldiers. Moreover, there were Hungarian actresses who were great stars in Nazi Germany (notably Marika Rökk and Clara Tabody) and who participated in propaganda films throughout the war; yet they never had to face charges for their political activity, continued their film careers after the war and are still admired and recognized today as major screen stars of the past.

Selected filmography
 Black Diamonds (1938)
 Azurexpress (1938)
 Stars of Variety (1939)
 Gül Baba (1940)
 Rózsafabot (1940)
 Leányvásár (1941)
 One Night in Transylvania (1941)
 Hungarista Est a Magyar Művelődés Házában.1944. (1944)

Archive footage
 A Jávor (1987)

External links

1915 births
1999 deaths
Hungarian film actresses
Actresses from Budapest
Hungarian stage actresses
20th-century Hungarian actresses